Battle of the Sexes is the seventh studio album by American rapper Ludacris, released March 9, 2010 on Disturbing tha Peace and Def Jam South. The album was recorded during 2008 to 2010 and its production was handled by several producers, including T-Minus, Bangladesh, Swizz Beatz, The Neptunes, and The Runners.

Upon its release, Battle of the Sexes received generally positive reviews from most music critics.

Background
Battle of the Sexes was tagged as a collaboration album by Ludacris and label-mate Shawnna. In April 2009, the promotional single titled "Everybody Drunk" which features vocals from Shawnna was released. Shawnna reportedly split from Disturbing tha Peace in 2009 and signed to Nappy Boy Entertainment. It was later reported that Shawnna was removed from the album and became a solo album by Ludacris with guest appearances.

Recording
The album began recording in 2008. Ludacris stated he wanted the album to highlight different view points from males and females; several songs in which he recorded tracks with included artists such as: Nicki Minaj, Lil' Kim, Eve, Trina, Shawnna, Ciara, Ne-Yo, Monica, Flo Rida and Gucci Mane. Pharrell recorded with Ludacris and contributed production and vocals. Bangladesh, Swizz Beatz and J.U.S.T.I.C.E. League also contributed production to the album.

Release and promotion
After several projected release dates, the album was finally released on March 9, 2010, through Disturbing tha Peace and its distributing label Def Jam Recordings. In April 2009, Ludacris released a promotional single for the album, titled "Everybody Drunk", which featured Shawnna. The single failed to chart, and though it appears on the album, the album version features new Disturbing tha Peace signee Lil Scrappy, instead of Shawnna. Official promotion for the album began when Ludacris debuted the first single "How Low" on October 10, 2009, when he performed it at the 2009 BET Hip-Hop Awards. It was made available for digital download on iTunes in December 2009. Ludacris next released three remixes to United States radio stations help promote the song. One of which features Ciara and Pitbull was made available on iTunes on February 9, 2010. He has also filmed a video for the album's second official single, "My Chick Bad" with female rapper Nicki Minaj, and the remix, which featured Eve, Diamond, and Trina. Shawnna provides "additional vocals" on the songs "I Do It All Night", "BOTS Radio" (featuring I-20), "Feelin' So Sexy", and the bonus track "Rollercoaster" (featuring Dru Hill).

Singles
"How Low" was released as the first official single on December 8, 2009. It became a huge mainstream success, peaking at number six in the United States. It went on to achieve double platinum status.
"My Chick Bad", which features Nicki Minaj, was released as the second official single on February 23, 2010. This single was also a big success, peaking at No. 11 in the United States and later also going double platinum.
"Sex Room", which features Trey Songz, was released as the third single on May 18, 2010. On the week ending April 10, 2010, "Sex Room" debuted on the U.S. Billboard Hot R&B/Hip-Hop Songs at 28.
In September 2010, Billboard announced that "Everybody Drunk" with Lil Scrappy, would be the next single. A video for the song was released on September 24, 2010.

Apart from its official singles, "Hey Ho", which features Lil' Kim and Lil Fate, was released as a promotional single prior to the release of the album on February 16, 2010, as part of iTunes' countdown to Battle of the Sexes.

Critical reception

Upon its release, the album received generally positive reviews from most music critics, based on an aggregate score of 68/100 from Metacritic. Allmusic writer David Jeffries gave it 3 out of 5 stars and viewed it as a "porno-style album", stating "Limited and a little patched together, but if cheap thrills are what you’re after, this one puts the dirty back in dirty south". The A.V. Clubs Nathan Rabin viewed its "R&B heavy" material as a weakness, but gave the album a B+ rating and praised Ludacris's lyricism, writing "Ludacris remains an underrated lyricist with unparalleled verbal dexterity. His liquid flow crams an awful lot of polysyllabic words into even the tawdriest sex jam, and no rapper alive conveys joy as effortlessly or infectiously". Giving it  out of 4 stars, Los Angeles Times critic August Brown called Battle of the Sexes "another welcome occasion to listen to Luda enjoying the real love of his life -- the sound of his own voice", and described its music as "fizzy pillow talk and respectfully tawdry club fodder". Despite viewing Ludacris's lyrics as from the male perspective, USA Todays Elysa Gardner commended him for his humor and wrote that the album is "more appealing, and more artful, when Ludacris directs his crude, breezy rhymes where they're best suited: into unabashed displays of loopy lust and boneheaded bravado". XXL writer Rondell Conway gave Battle of the Sexes an XL rating and shared a similar sentiment, stating "Luda may not have evened the playing field, but he certainly created an excellent musical forum for the sexes to air out their differences". Newsdays Glenn Gamboa gave the album a B rating and commended Ludacris for his musical balance, writing "Not only does Luda know when a song needs an R&B crooner or a female voice, he knows when he needs to speed up a flow or rough up a rhyme".

However, Sarah Godfrey of The Washington Post found its "sexed-up, party-oriented music - catchy but hardly groundbreaking" and viewed the female lyrical perspective as minimal, stating "There is plenty of fun happening on Battle of the Sexes, but still, the fellas clearly run it; the ladies are hardly even given a chance". NOWs Jason Richards gave the album 1 out of 5 stars and wrote "Battle seems like an opportunity for the rapper to be more ignorant than ever". HipHopDX writer Kathy Iandoli gave it  out of 5 stars and shared a similar sentiment, calling it "an idea that lost momentum somewhere in the middle of its inception, and the result is a haphazard collection of cuts with no clear direction". Jesal Padania of RapReviews gave Battle of the Sexes a 5.5/10 rating and perceived its lyrics as "instantly forgettable". The Harvard Crimsons Araba A. Appiagyei-Dankah gave it  out of 5 stars and wrote "When the album remembers to be a “battle” rather than an endless string of mildly memorable dance tunes and awkward sex songs, it presents a one-sided and misogynistic view of women". Despite noting that "there really isn't much of a battle at all", Exclaim!s Neil Acharya commended Ludacris for his performance on the album, stating "he seems content to do what he does best: make a pretty run-of-the-mill topic enjoyable with his off-kilter humour and exceptional flow". The Boston Globe writer Ken Capobianco called it "a riotous, raucous set" and wrote favorably of Ludacris's "good-humoured" lyrics. Entertainment Weeklys Simon Vozick-Levinson gave Battle of the Sexes a B− rating and expressed a mixed response towards its themes, but commended Ludacris for his rapping, stating "his gymnastic flow and irrepressible personality redeem more tracks than not".

Commercial performance
The album debuted at number one on Billboard 200, selling 137,300 copies in its first week. This makes it Ludacris' fourth #1 album.  In its second week, it dropped to No. 2, selling 61,200 copies. In its third week, the album dropped to No. 6, moving 45,000 units. In its fourth week the album sold 40,000 units. The fifth week it sold 25,000 more copies. It has spent six straight weeks at the top of the Top Rap Albums chart. As of March 16, 2015, the album has sold 632,000 copies in the United States. The album was certified gold by the Recording Industry Association of America in June 2010.

Track listing

Notes
  signifies a songwriter from a sample.
  signifies a songwriter that is only listed on digital editions of the album.

Sample Credits
 "How Low" contains samples of "Bring the Noise", performed by Public Enemy, written by Carl Ridenhour, Eric Sadler and Hank Shocklee.
 "Everybody Drunk" contains a sample of "You Don't Want Drama", performed by 8Ball & MJG, written by Shondrae Crawford, Marlon Goodwin and Premro Smith.
 "I Know You Got a Man" contains elements of "I Got a Man", performed by Positive K, written by Roland Bautista, Darryl Gibson, Janice-Marie Johnson and Byron Miller.
 "Hey Ho" contains interpolations of "W.F.Y.", performed by Electrik Red, written by Christopher Stewart and Terius Nash.
 "Feelin' So Sexy" contains a sample of "Don't Look Back" performed by Télépopmusik featuring Angela McCluskey, written by Fabrice Dumont, Stephane Haeri, Christophe Hetier and Angela McCluskey.

Personnel
Credits adapted from Tidal.

 Kevin Cates – production (8, 11)
 Bangladesh – production (9, 17)
 T-Minus – production (2, 16)
 The Legendary Traxster – production (3, 14)
 Xcel – production (1)
 DJ Montay – production (4)
 B-Crucial – production (5)
 Tony Dinero – production (5)
 Kajun – production (6)
 Infinity – production (7)
 The Runners – production (10)
 Gaggie – production (12)
 Swizz Beatz – production (13)
 The Neptunes – production (15)
 Marcus Allen – co-production (11)

Charts

Weekly charts

Year-end charts

Certifications

See also
 List of Billboard 200 number-one albums of 2010

References

External links
 Official website
 
 Ludacris Is on Both Sides in Battle of the Sexes at PopMatters

2010 albums
Albums produced by Bangladesh (record producer)
Albums produced by Swizz Beatz
Albums produced by T-Minus (record producer)
Albums produced by The Legendary Traxster
Albums produced by the Neptunes
Albums produced by the Runners
Def Jam Recordings albums
Ludacris albums
Disturbing tha Peace albums